Serdar Gürler (born 14 September 1991) is a professional footballer who plays as a right winger or forward for İstanbul Başakşehir. Born in France, he represents Turkey at international level.

Career
Gürler plays as an attacking midfielder and is capable of playing on both wings and as a support striker. He made his professional debut on 10 April 2010 in a league match against Saint-Étienne. On 2 September 2010, Gürler signed his first professional contract agreeing to a three-year deal with Sochaux until June 2013. On 2 July 2011, he joined Samsunspor on loan until the end of the 2011–12 Süper Lig.

Gürler joined Osmanlıspor in June 2017.

On 7 August 2018, Gürler joined Huesca in La Liga.

He went on loan to Göztepe in January 2019.

On 13 January 2022, Gürler signed a three-and-a-half-year deal with İstanbul Başakşehir.

International career
Gürler was born in France to Turkish parents. He was a Turkish youth international having earned caps with the under-18 and under-19 teams. He made his international debut for the Turkey national football team in a friendly 3–1 win over Moldova on 27 March 2017.

Career statistics

Club

International goals

References

Halil Altıntop ve Serdar Gürler Gençlerbirliği'nde, milliyet.com.tr, 6 January 2016

External links
 
 
 
 

1991 births
Living people
People from Haguenau
Footballers from Alsace
Sportspeople from Bas-Rhin
Association football wingers
Turkish footballers
Turkey international footballers
Turkey B international footballers
Turkey under-21 international footballers
Turkey youth international footballers
Turkish expatriate footballers
Turkish expatriate sportspeople in Spain
French expatriate sportspeople in Spain
Expatriate footballers in Spain
French footballers
French expatriate footballers
French people of Turkish descent
FC Sochaux-Montbéliard players
Ligue 1 players
Süper Lig players
Elazığspor footballers
Trabzonspor footballers
Göztepe S.K. footballers
İstanbul Başakşehir F.K. players
La Liga players
SD Huesca footballers